Okapi Forum is a multi-purpose arena in Aalst, Belgium.  Okapi Forum holds room for 2,800 people for basketball games.  It hosts the home games of the BNXT League club Okapi Aalst, as well as performances of music artists.

See also 
 Sport in Belgium
 Belgian Basketball Cup
 Belgian Basketball Supercup
 Music in Belgium

Indoor arenas in Belgium
Basketball venues in Belgium
Sports venues in East Flanders
Aalst, Belgium